Robert Henry Richard was an Anglican priest in Australia during the late 19th and early 20th centuries.

Richard was educated at St David's College, Lampeter and ordained in 1893. After  curacies in Newport, West Derby, Handsworth and Howden, he travelled to Australia. Richard held incumbencies at New Norfolk, Zeehan, Queenstown and Wynyard, Tasmania. During World War One he was a Chaplain to the Austraian Armed Forces. He was Archdeacon of Hobart from 1923 until his death in 1929.

Richard was commended for his heroic endeavours at the time of the North Mount Lyell disaster.

References

1929 deaths
Anglican archdeacons in Tasmania
Alumni of the University of Wales, Lampeter
19th-century English Anglican priests
20th-century Australian Anglican priests
Australian military chaplains